Football Club Dordoi Bishkek is a Kyrgyz professional football club based in Bishkek, that competes in the Kyrgyz Premier League. Founded in 1997, the club is owned by "Dordoi" Association, the group of companies that also own Dordoi Bazaar in Bishkek.

History
The club was founded in 1997. Dordoi appointed Anarbek Ormombekov as their new manager in November 2015, firing him on 6 June 2016, due to poor results, with Ruslan Sydykov being appointed as manager until the end of the season. On 18 August 2016, Murat Dzhumakeev was appointed as acting head coach for Dordoi Bishkek's 2017 AFC Cup qualifiers, due to Ruslan Sydykov not having the required coaching qualifications for AFC competitions.

On 2 June 2017, Aleksandr Krestinin was appointed as the club's new manager until the end of 2018. After victory in the Premier League and League Cup in 2018, Dordoi extended their agreement with Krestinin till end of 2020.

On 4 March 2019, "Dordoi" signed a sponsorship agreement with the construction company Nurzaman for the 2019 and 2020 seasons.

On 1 December 2021, Murat Dzhumakeyev was announced as Dordoi Bishkek's new Head Coach after Aleksandr Krestinin and his coaching teams contract had expired.

In May 2021, the British Fans' Association of FC Dordoi Bishkek was founded.

On 29 November 2022, Zakir Dzhalilov was appointed as Dordoi Bishkek's new Head Coach for the 2023 season.

Names
1997: Founded as FC Dordoi Naryn.
1998: Renamed FC Dordoi-Zhashtyk-SKIF Naryn.
1999: Renamed FC Dordoi Naryn.
2004: Renamed FC Dordoi-Dynamo Naryn.
2010: Renamed FC "Dordoi".

Sponsorship

Domestic history

Continental

Commonwealth of Independent States Cup
2007: Group Stage
2008: Group Stage
2009: Group Stage
2010: Group Stage

Current squad

Notable managers
''Information correct as of match played 30 October 2015. Only competitive matches are counted.

Notes:
P – Total of played matches
W – Won matches
D – Drawn matches
L – Lost matches
GS – Goal scored
GA – Goals against
%W – Percentage of matches won

Nationality is indicated by the corresponding FIFA country code(s).

Honours

Domestic
Kyrgyzstan League
Champions (13): 2004, 2005, 2006, 2007, 2008, 2009, 2011, 2012, 2014, 2018, 2019, 2020, 2021
Kyrgyzstan Cup
Winners (10): 2004, 2005, 2006, 2008, 2010, 2012, 2014, 2016, 2017, 2018
Super Cup
Winners (5): 2012, 2013, 2014, 2019, 2021

Continental
AFC President's Cup
Winners (2): 2006, 2007

References

External links
Profile at sport.kg (1997–2001)
Profile at sport.kg (2002–2005)
FC Dordoi page at sport.kg
Official website

 
Football clubs in Kyrgyzstan
Football clubs in Bishkek
Association football clubs established in 1997
Works association football teams
D